The Mayor is the highest-ranking official in a municipal government in Nepal. There are in total 293 mayors in Nepal (6 metropolitan cities, 11 sub-metropolitan cities, and 276 municipalities).  Mayors are very powerful in the municipal government. They are the head of the local government of Nepal . The data available here is of before split of Nepal Communist Party, CPN(UML) and People's Socialist Party, Nepal.

Overview

List of mayors of Nepal

Koshi Pradesh

There is 1 Metropolitan city, 2 Sub-Metropolitan cities and 46 Municipalities in Koshi Pradesh . All together there are 49 Mayors in Koshi Pradesh. 

 Nepali Congress-24
 CPN (UML)-23
 CPN (Unified Socialist)-1
 RPP-1

Madhesh Pradesh
There is 1 Metropolitan city, 3 Sub-Metropolitan Cities, 73 Municipalities in Province No. 2. Altogether there are 77 Mayors in Province no. 2.

 Nepali Congress-30
 CPN (UML)-19
 PSP-N-8
 CPN (MC)-7
 CPN (Unified Socialist)-5

Bagmati Province
Bagmati Pradesh have 3 Metropolitan cities, 1 Sub-Metropolitan city and 41 Municipalities. Altogether there are 45 Mayors In Bagmati province .

 Nepali Congress-24
 CPN (UML)-9
 CPN (MC)-5
 CPN (Unified Socialist)-4
 RPP-1
 NWPP-1
 Independent-1

Gandaki Province

There is 1 Metropolitan city and 26 Municipalities in Gandaki Pradesh. Altogether there are 27 Mayors In Gandaki Pradesh.

 Nepali Congress-15
 CPN (UML)-8
 CPN (MC)-2
 CPN (Unified Socialist)-1
 Janamrorcha-1

Lumbini Province

There are 4 Sub-Metropolitan cities and 32 Municipalities. Altogether there are 36 Mayors In Province No 5 .

 Nepali Congress-21
 CPN (UML)-9
 CPN (MC)-3
 RPP-1
 PSP-N-1
 Janamrorcha-1

Karnali Province

There are only 1 Sub-Metropolitan City and 24 Municipalities and Mayors in Karnali Pradesh.

 Nepali Congress-13
 CPN (UML)-6
 CPN (MC)-5
 CPN (Unified Socialist)-1

Sudurpashchim Province
There are altogether 33 Municipalities, 1 Sub-metropolitan city in Sudurpachim Pradesh. In total there are 34 Mayors in Sudurpachim Pradesh.

 Nepali Congress-18
 CPN (UML)-8
 CPN (MC)-3
 NUP-2
 CPN (Unified Socialist)-1
 Independent-1

See also
List of chairpersons of rural municipalities in Nepal
2022 Nepalese local elections
Government of Nepal

References

Nepal
Mayors